Francis Gore was a British officer.

Francis Gore may also refer to:
Francis Gore (cricketer), English cricketer and British Army officer
Francis Ormsby-Gore, 6th Baron Harlech (1954–2016), peer in the United Kingdom
Sir Francis Knox-Gore, 1st Baronet of the Knox-Gore baronets

See also
Frank Gore (born 1983), American football running back